Joseph Nunez (sometimes credited as Joe Nunez) is an American actor and comedian most notable for his recurring role as Manche Sanchez on the show Prison Break.

Career
He also played a cleaner in The 40-Year-Old Virgin, and the man who ran over Chris Gardner in The Pursuit of Happyness. In 2007, Nunez made a memorable appearance in Superbad as an employee at a liquor store and has also appeared in the films Bridesmaids, Let's Go to Prison and School for Scoundrels. Nunez also made frequent appearances in the Comedy Central sketch comedy series Nick Swardson's Pretend Time.

In 2010, Nunez played the role of Migo Salazar in the pilot for the FOX sitcom Running Wilde, but the role was recast after the pilot episode.

In 2012, he played a security guard in the movie The Watch.

Filmography

Film

External links

Year of birth missing (living people)
Living people
American male comedians
21st-century American comedians
American male film actors
American male television actors